Penniverpa is a genus of stiletto flies in the family Therevidae. There are about 14 described species in Penniverpa.

Species
These 14 species belong to the genus Penniverpa:

 Penniverpa alvatra Irwin & Webb, 1992 c g
 Penniverpa bradleyi Webb, 2008 c g
 Penniverpa chersonesa Webb, 2008 c g
 Penniverpa dives Schiner, 1868 c g
 Penniverpa epidema Webb, 2008 c g
 Penniverpa evani Webb, 2008 c g
 Penniverpa festina (Coquillett, 1893) i c g b
 Penniverpa gracilis (Krober, 1911) c
 Penniverpa insular Webb, 2008 c g
 Penniverpa megaplax Webb, 2008 c g
 Penniverpa multisetosa Webb, 2008 c g
 Penniverpa parvula (Krober, 1911) c g
 Penniverpa senilis (Fabricius, 1805) i g
 Penniverpa unispinosa Webb, 2008 c g

Data sources: i = ITIS, c = Catalogue of Life, g = GBIF, b = Bugguide.net

References

Further reading

 

Therevidae
Articles created by Qbugbot
Asiloidea genera